Baron Cederstrom may refer to:

Bror Cederström (1780-1877)
Carl Cederström (1867-1918)